Estola daidalea is a species of beetle in the family Cerambycidae. It was described by Martins and Galileo in 2002. It is known from Ecuador.

References

Estola
Beetles described in 2002